Argyll's Bowling Green ( meaning "sunny hamlet" or "sunny cattle fold") is an area on the Ardgoil estate in Argyll and Bute, Scotland. It is also known as the Ardgoil peninsula and is the most southerly part of the Arrochar Alps and lies between Loch Goil and Loch Long. It is part of the Argyll Forest Park and is within the Loch Lomond and the Trossachs National Park.

The name is marked on James Dorret's 1750 General Map of Scotland and Islands thereto belonging.  In the 1834-45 account by Rev John McDougal, minister of the area, he describes how people going to the low country (south) had to climb the “Duke of Argyle’s bowling green”. This was part of a route called the “Duke's Path” which started on the shore of Loch Goil and ended at a place called Mark on the shore of Loch Long where you crossed the loch by boat.

The name is an anglicisation of the Gaelic, which may be consciously humorous, as there is very little flat land. The name originally referred to a small grazing ground on the south east side of the peninsula above Mark but is sometimes used to describe the peninsula.

The mountains of the peninsula include:

Ben Donich 847m
The Brack 787m
Cnoc Coinnich 761m
Beinn Reithe 653m
The Saddle 521m   
Clach Bheinn 437m
Tom Molach 370m
Càrn Glas 502m
Tom nan Gamhna 389m
The Steeple 390m

References
 Murray, W.H. (1977) The Companion Guide to the West Highlands of Scotland. London. Collins.
 Statistical Account of the United Parishes of Lochgoilhead & Kilmorich (1791–99) by Rev. Dugal McDougal
 Statistical Account of the United Parishes of Lochgoilhead & Kilmorich (1834–45) by Rev. John McDougal

Notes

Peninsulas of Scotland
Landforms of Argyll and Bute